Pleurotus is a genus of gilled mushrooms which includes one of the most widely eaten mushrooms, P. ostreatus.  Species of Pleurotus may be called oyster, abalone, or tree mushrooms, and are some of the most commonly cultivated edible mushrooms in the world.  Pleurotus fungi have also been used in mycoremediation of pollutants, such as petroleum and polycyclic aromatic hydrocarbons.

Etymology
The genus name Pleurotus literally means side ear in reference to the mushroom caps being laterally attached to the substrate.

Description
The caps may be laterally attached (with no stipe). If there is a stipe, it is normally eccentric and the gills are decurrent along it. The term pleurotoid is used for any mushroom with this general shape.

The spores are smooth and elongated (described as "cylindrical"). Where hyphae meet, they are joined by clamp connections.  Pleurotus is not considered to be a bracket fungus, and most of the species are monomitic (with a soft consistency).  However, remarkably, Pleurotus dryinus can sometimes be dimitic, meaning that it has additional skeletal hyphae, which give it a tougher consistency like bracket fungi.

Ecology
Pleurotus fungi are found in both tropical and temperate climates throughout the world.  Most species of Pleurotus are white-rot fungi on hardwood trees, although some also decay conifer wood. Pleurotus eryngii is unusual in being a weak parasite of herbaceous plants, and P. tuber-regium produces underground sclerotia.  

In addition to being saprotrophic, all species of Pleurotus are also nematophagous, catching nematodes by paralyzing them with a toxin. In the case of the carnivorous mushroom Pleurotus ostreatus, it was shown that small, fragile lollipop-shaped structures (toxocysts) on fungal hyphae contain a volatile ketone, 3-octanone, which disrupts the cell membrane integrity of nematodes, leading to rapid cell and organismal death, hypothetically either to defend themselves and/or to acquire nutrients.

Cuisine
Oyster mushrooms are popular for cooking, torn up instead of sliced, especially in stir fry or sauté, because they are consistently thin, and so will cook more evenly than uncut mushrooms of other types. They are often used in vegetarian cuisine.

Taxonomy

The classification of species within the genus Pleurotus is difficult due to high phenotypic variability across wide geographic ranges, geographic overlap of species, and ongoing evolution and speciation.  Early taxonomic efforts placed the oyster mushrooms within a very broad Agaricus as Agaricus ostreatus (Jacq. 1774).  Paul Kummer defined the genus Pleurotus in 1871; since then, the genus has been narrowed with some species reclassified to other genera, such as Favolaschia, Hohenbuehelia, Lentinus, Marasmiellus, Omphalotus, Panellus, Pleurocybella, and Resupinatus.  See Singer (1986) for an example of Pleurotus taxonomy based on morphological characteristics.

Phylogeny
More recently, molecular phylogenetics has been utilized to determine genetic and evolutionary relationships between groups within the genus, delineating discrete clades.  Pleurotus, along with the closely related genus Hohenbuehelia, has been shown to be monophyletic.  Tests of cross-breeding viability between groups have been used to further define which groups are deserving of species rank, as opposed to subspecies, variety, or synonymy.  If two groups of morphologically distinct Pleurotus fungi are able to cross-breed and produce fertile offspring, they meet one definition of species.  These reproductively discrete groups, referred to as intersterility groups, have begun to be defined in Pleurotus.  Many binomial names used in literature are now being grouped together as species complexes using this technique, and may change.

Phylogenetic species
The following species list is organized according to 1. phylogenetic clade, 2. intersterility group (group number in Roman numerals) or sub-clade, and then 3. any older binomial names that have been found to be closely related, reproductively compatible, or synonymous, although they may no longer be taxonomically valid. This list is likely to be incomplete.

 P. ostreatus clade
 I. P. ostreatus (oyster or pearl oyster mushroom) – North America and northern Eurasia
 P. florida
 II. P. pulmonarius (phoenix or Indian oyster mushroom) – North America, Eurasia, and Australasia
 P. columbinus
 P. sapidus
 III. P. populinus – North America
 VI. P. eryngii (king oyster mushroom) – Europe and the Middle East
 P. ferulae
 P. fossulatus – Afghanistan
 P. nebrodensis
 XII. P. abieticola – Asia
 XIII. P. albidus – Caribbean, Central America, South America
P. djamor-cornucopiae clade 
 IV. P. cornucopiae (branched oyster mushroom) – Europe
 P. citrinopileatus (golden oyster mushroom) – eastern Asia
 P. euosmus (tarragon oyster mushroom)
 V. P. djamor (pink oyster mushroom) – pantropical
 P. flabellatus
 P. salmoneo-stramineus
 P. salmonicolor
 XI. P. opuntiae – North America, New Zealand
 XVI. P. calyptratus
 P. cystidiosus clade 
 VII. P. cystidiosus (abalone mushroom) – global
 P. abalonus – Taiwan
 P. fuscosquamulosus – Africa, Europe
 P. smithii – Mexico
 IX. P. dryinus – North America, Europe, and New Zealand
 VIII. Lentinus levis – subtropical to tropical, moved to genus Lentinus.
 X. P. tuber-regium (king tuber mushroom) – Africa, Asia, Australasia
 XIV. P. australis (brown oyster mushroom) – Australia and New Zealand
 XV. P. purpureo-olivaceus – Australia and New Zealand
 P. rattenburyi

Incertae sedis species
 P. parsonsii
 P. velatus

Former species
 P. gardneri was reclassified to the genus Neonothopanus in 2011.
 P. levis was reclassified to the genus Lentinus.
 P. sajor-caju was reclassified to the genus Lentinus.
 P. nidiformis was reclassified to the genus Omphalotus in 1994.

See also
 Antromycopsis – an anamorphic form of Pleurotus
 List of Pleurotus species

References

External links

 Pleurotus Genus on the Mushroom, the Journal of Wild Mushrooming site
 Oysters: Pleurotoid Mushrooms at MushroomExpert.com
 

Pleurotaceae
Carnivorous fungi
Agaricales genera
Taxa named by Elias Magnus Fries
Bioluminescent fungi